Parker Allen Mushinski (born November 22, 1995) is an American professional baseball pitcher for the Houston Astros of Major League Baseball (MLB). He played college baseball for Texas Tech University. He made his MLB debut in 2022.

Amateur career
Mushinski attended Argyle High School in Argyle, Texas. As a senior in 2014, Mushinski posted a 2.10 ERA with 98 strikeouts over 51 innings. Undrafted out of high school, Mushinski attended Texas Tech University over three seasons (2015-2017) to play college baseball for the Red Raiders. As a junior, he posted a 3–2 record with a 2.15 ERA and 47 strikeouts over  innings. He was drafted by the Houston Astros in the 7th round of the 2017 MLB draft and signed with them.

Professional career
Mushinski spent his professional debut season of 2017 with the Tri-City ValleyCats, going 3–1 with a 3.60 ERA and 40 strikeouts over 30 innings. He spent the 2018 season with the Quad Cities River Bandits, going 4–2 with a 2.33 ERA and 114 strikeouts over 89 innings. Mushinski split the 2019 season between the GCL Astros, the Fayetteville Woodpeckers and the Corpus Christi Hooks, going a combined 0–2 with a 4.35 ERA and 74 strikeouts over 62 innings. He did not play in 2020 due to the cancellation of the Minor League Baseball season because of the COVID-19 pandemic. Mushinski posted a 2.84 ERA with 18 strikeouts over  innings for the Sugar Land Skeeters in 2021. He opened the 2022 season with the Sugar Land Space Cowboys.

On April 16, 2022, Houston selected Mushinski's contract and promoted him to the active roster.  Due to left elbow discomfort, the Astros placed Mushinski on the 15-day IL on June 7 and recalled Brandon Bielak from Sugar Land to replace him on the roster.  Mushunski was activated July 21, 2022.

See also

 List of people from Arlington, Texas
 List of sportspeople educated at Texas Tech University

References

External links

Red Raiders bio

1995 births
Living people
Baseball players from Arlington, Texas
People from Denton County, Texas
Major League Baseball pitchers
Houston Astros players
Texas Tech Red Raiders baseball players
Gulf Coast Astros players
Tri-City ValleyCats players
Quad Cities River Bandits players
Fayetteville Woodpeckers players
Corpus Christi Hooks players
Sugar Land Skeeters players
Sugar Land Space Cowboys players